John Gordon (25 July 1912 – 30 January 1981) was an Irish Roman Catholic archbishop and diplomat of the Holy See.

Biography
Gordon was born at Clarecastle, County Clare and ordained to the priesthood on 7 March 1936. 

On 10 February 1962, Pope John XXIII appointed him Apostolic Delegate to Thailand and the Malacca Peninsula, as well as Titular Archbishop of Nicopolis ad Nestum. 

His episcopal consecration took place on 24 June 1962. The principal consecrator was cardinal Amleto Giovanni Cicognani, and the co-consecrators were Archbishop Leone Giovanni Battista Nigris and Bishop Patrick Joseph Dunne.

Pope Paul VI appointed him Apostolic Delegate to Northern Africa on 27 February 1965.

On 14 July 1967, Pope Paul named him Apostolic Pro-Nuncio to Lesotho and on 16 July 1967 Apostolic Delegate to Southern Africa. 

On 11 August 1971, he was named Apostolic Pro-Nuncio to India. 

On 11 June 1976 he was named Apostolic Pro-Nuncio to the Netherlands.

References

External links
 catholic-hierarchy.org 

Apostolic Nuncios to India
Apostolic Nuncios to Thailand
Apostolic Nuncios to the Netherlands
Apostolic Nuncios to Lesotho
Apostolic Nuncios to South Africa
1912 births
1981 deaths
20th-century Roman Catholic titular archbishops
People from County Clare
Place of death missing
Irish Roman Catholic titular bishops